Lachlan Maclean may refer to:

Lachlan Lubanach Maclean of Duart (c.1350–c.1405), 5th Clan Chief of Clan Maclean
Lachlan Bronneach Maclean (fl. 1470s), 7th Clan Chief of Clan Maclean
Lachlan Og Maclean (c. 1432–1484), 8th Clan Chief of Clan Maclean
Lachlan Maclean, 10th Clan Chief of Clan Maclean (fl. 1510s)
Lachlan Cattanach Maclean (c. 1465–1523), 11th Clan Chief of Clan Maclean
Sir Lachlan Mor Maclean (1558–1598), 14th Clan Chief of Clan Maclean
Sir Lachlan Maclean, 1st Baronet (c. 1620–1649), 17th Clan Chief of Clan Maclean
Sir Lachlan Hector Charles Maclean, 12th Baronet (born 1942), 28th Clan Chief of Clan Maclean
Lachlan Maclean, 6th Laird of Coll
Lachlan Maclean, 3rd Laird of Torloisk, 17th-century Scottish nobleman
Lauchlan Maclean, 2nd Laird of Brolas (1650–1687)